Chamaebatia foliolosa is a species of aromatic evergreen shrub in the rose family known by the common names mountain misery and bearclover. It is endemic to the mountains of California, where it grows in coniferous forests. The Miwok tribe's name for the plant was kit-kit-dizze. It was used as an herbal remedy for colds, coughs, rheumatism, chicken pox, measles, smallpox and other diseases.

Description 
The stems are covered in dark brown bark. The foliage is made up of 3-pinnate leaves, meaning the frondlike leaves are made up of leaflets which in turn are made up of smaller leaflets which are also subdivided. The fernlike leaves are up to 10 centimeters long, frilly in appearance and dotted with sticky glands. The roselike flowers have rounded white petals and yellow centers ringed with many stamens. The species has been documented as carrying out nitrogen fixation, unusual for a plant in its family. Black gum from the plant may stick to clothing, and it is highly flammable due to its resin.

References

External links
Jepson Manual Treatment
Photo gallery
Native American Ethnobotany database

Dryadoideae
Flora of California